Kenneth Bingham may refer to:

Kenny Bingham (born 1980), cricketer
Ken Bingham, a character in Ann Carver's Profession
Kenneth Bingham (politician) (born 1962), member of the South Carolina House of Representatives